The article covers the Hurricane Katrina effects by region, within the United States and Canada. The effects of Hurricane Katrina, in late August 2005, were catastrophic and widespread. It was one of the deadliest natural disasters in U.S. history, leaving at least 1,836 people dead, and a further 135 missing. The storm was large and had an effect on several different areas of North America.



Florida
  
More than 1 million customers were left without electricity, and damage in Florida was estimated at between $1 and $2 billion (with most of the damage coming from flooding and overturned trees).

Two traffic fatalities related to Katrina were also reported on the Florida Panhandle in Walton County, and moderate to locally heavy damage was reported in the western part of the Panhandle (on the outer edge of Katrina), which had already been hit hard by Hurricane Ivan in September 2004 and Hurricane Dennis in July 2005.

Louisiana
The eye of the storm passed 27 miles east of downtown New Orleans at 8:30 AM. The primary areas that were affected were southeastern Louisiana, including the city of New Orleans, Louisiana, the parishes of St. Tammany (Slidell), Jefferson (Gretna), Terrebonne (Houma), Plaquemines (Buras), Lafourche (Thibodaux), and St. Bernard (Chalmette).

According to officials nearly one million people were temporarily without electricity in Louisiana for several weeks. On September 1, 2005, 800,000 homes were without electricity. Numerous roadways were flooded or damaged and many evacuations conducted by boat and helicopter.

Approximately 46,000 National Guard were dispatched to the area as part of the disaster relief effort. The United States Navy also announced that four amphibious ships would be sent from Norfolk, Virginia within a few days to assist the relief efforts. The US Coast Guard rescued 1,259 survivors off rooftops by Wednesday morning August 31, less than two days after landfall, and more than 1,000 the next day. In less than two weeks 12,535 flood victims were saved by helicopter. In all, the Coast Guard made 33,544 rescues by helicopter and boats.

By July 1, 2006, when new population estimates were calculated by the U.S. Census Bureau, the population of the state of Louisiana declined by 219,563, or 4.87%.

Just as matters were beginning to improve in 2010, the Deepwater Horizon oil spill in the Gulf in April 2010 caused massive amounts of oil to come ashore in the wetlands and marshes in Plaquemines Parish and other areas of coastal Louisiana near New Orleans that had been most heavily damaged by Katrina, and the spill will likely reach other states that were also affected by the storm (the hurricane had caused or exacerbated oil spills on a smaller scale when it hit).

New Orleans

Mayor Ray Nagin did not order a mandatory evacuation of the city until August 28, 2005. Approximately one million people had fled the city and its surrounding suburbs by the evening of August 28, while about 100,000 people remained in the city, with about 10,000 taking shelter at the Louisiana Superdome which had been prepared to accommodate only 800. Eventually, 30,000 arrived at the Superdome before they were evacuated.

By August 31, eighty percent (80%) of the city of New Orleans was flooded by Hurricane Katrina, with some parts of the city under , of water. Over 50 breaches in region's levee system were catalogued, five of which resulted in massive flooding of New Orleans. The 17th Street Canal levee was just south of the Hammond Highway Bridge. Levees adjacent to London Avenue breached in two locations: one near Robert E. Lee Boulevard and one between Filmore Avenue and Mirabeau Avenue. Two breaches also occurred in the Industrial Canal adjacent to Surekote Road. Levee repair efforts were undertaken, involving reinforcing the levees with  sandbags deployed by U.S. Army Chinook and Black Hawk helicopters. The 17th Street Canal levee repair was completed by September 5, 2005, and subsequently, the three canals were repaired all the way to Lake Pontchartrain. The Army Corps of Engineers added flood gates to the three canals.

Many evacuees were trapped in flooded houses and rooftops waiting to be rescued. The Superdome sustained significant damage and much of the dome's waterproof membrane had essentially been peeled off. On August 30, Louisiana governor Kathleen Blanco ordered the complete evacuation of the remaining people that sought shelter in the Superdome. Blanco instructed the Adjutant General of the Louisiana National Guard, Major General Bennett C. Landreneau to contact Honoré of Northern Command (Honoré arrived on Wednesday, August 31, as the commander of the newly established Joint Task Force Katrina to supervise federal military operations) to arrange for active duty military support of response operations in Louisiana. Additionally, General Landreneau instructed Louisiana National Guard officials at the Superdome to cease planning for the evacuation as Honoré would be "taking charge" of the evacuation project. The evacuees were then transported to the Astrodome in Houston, Texas. The only route out of the city was west on the Crescent City Connection as the I-10 (twin span) bridge traveling east towards Slidell, Louisiana had collapsed. The Lake Pontchartrain Causeway was also carrying emergency traffic only.

St. Tammany Parish
Hurricane Katrina made its final landfall in eastern St. Tammany Parish. The western eye wall passed directly over St. Tammany Parish, Louisiana as a Category 3 hurricane at about 9:45 AM CST, August 29, 2005. The communities of Slidell, Avery Estates, Lakeshore Estates, Oak Harbor, Eden Isles and North Shore Beach were inundated by the storm surge that extended over six miles inland. The storm surge impacted all 57 miles of St. Tammany Parish's coastline, including Lacombe, Mandeville and Madisonville. The storm surge in the area of the Rigolets Pass is estimated 16 feet, not including wave action declining to 7 feet at Madisonville. The surge had a second peak in eastern St. Tammany as the westerly winds from the southern eye wall pushed the surge to the east, backing up at the bottleneck of the Rigolets Pass. The Twin Spans of I-10 between Slidell and New Orleans East were virtually destroyed, and much of I-10 in New Orleans East was under water. The Lake Pontchartrain Causeway and the Highway 11 bridge, connecting the north and south shores of Lake Pontchartrain, were open only to emergency traffic.

Initial search and rescue operations were conducted south of Highway 190 from Lacombe east to the state line. Fire District No. 1 and the St. Tammany Parish Sheriff's office evacuated over 3,000 people from flooded homes and rescued about 300 people in imminent danger.  Radio communications among first responders functioned throughout the rescue period but the 9-1-1 system was not operational for ten days. Utility services were not available anywhere in the parish. Generator power was available for hospitals and a special needs shelter. Hospitals were running at capacity on generator power.

The hurricane-force winds toppled trees and telephone poles parish-wide, blocking all transportation routes. Land debris cleanup continued into 2007 with over 6.6 million cubic yards collected. Debris cleaning in waterways continued at least through 2009.
Hurricane Katrina damaged 48,792 housing units in St. Tammany Parish from flood waters, high winds, or both.

Jefferson Parish
The breach on the east side of the 17th Street Canal levee did not cause severe flooding within Jefferson Parish, but some lower-lying areas did receive significant water damage, especially on the East Bank.

The Sheriff of Jefferson Parish reported that he expected his district to remain uninhabitable for at least one week and that residents should not return to the area. Incidents of looting were reported throughout affected areas of Louisiana, most notably in New Orleans. Louisiana governor Kathleen Blanco ordered all roadways into the state closed.

By one week after the storm, residents were allowed to return to their homes to retrieve essentials, provided that they could present identification proving that they lived in the parish. They were only allowed in to retrieve essential items, and were then required to leave the parish for another month.

Terrebonne Parish
In Terrebonne Parish, signs, trees, roofs and utility poles suffered the brunt of Hurricane Katrina's fury when the storm roared across Terrebonne and Lafourche. Most of Terrebonne Parish and Lafourche Parish were covered with water during the storm surge, yet Houma was spared to the extent that the Coast Guard used their airport for the initial rescue launch site. ""

Plaquemines Parish

Hurricane Katrina made a direct landfall in the "lower" (southern/down river) portion of Plaquemines Parish, Louisiana, the eye passed directly over the town of Empire, Louisiana. There was extensive flooding the majority of the Parish, and the southern part was temporarily "reclaimed" by the Mississippi River. All of the East Bank of the Parish was flooded, as was the downriver portion of the West Bank. Belle Chase mostly escaped with only moderate wind damage. The Belle Chasse Tunnel was flooded as well.

On August 29, the President of Plaquemines Parish, Benny Rousselle, issued a statement to all residents not to return to the parish until further notice. There were no public services available and all roads were closed and impassable. He requested that only employees in Drainage, Heavy Equipment, Public Right-of-Way Maintenance and Solid Waste departments return to the parish if possible.

Areas gradually opened up in late 2005.

St. Bernard Parish
St. Bernard Parish, Louisiana, which lies to the East of New Orleans and thus was closer to the path of the storm and the more exposed to the storm surge from the Gulf of Mexico, was completely flooded via water surging into Lake Borgne. A large portion of the flooding was apparently the result of levee failures along the Mississippi River – Gulf Outlet Canal, a  canal.

The Parish's two shelters at Chalmette High School and St. Bernard High School suffered considerable damage with flooding. Chalmette High lost much of its roof, and St. Bernard High had many broken windows. There were estimates of 300-plus evacuees at both sites.

By August 29, about 150 people were sighted on rooftops in areas that were under approximately 8–10 feet or more of water. Among those on the roofs were WDSU reporter Heath Allen and a St. Bernard resident on a government complex rooftop. Residents reported that even oil platform service boats were utilized to rescue survivors.

Several tragic deaths were reported at St. Rita's Nursing Home in the parish, as 35 people died due to drowning. The owners of the nursing home were arrested and charged with negligent homicide for not having evacuated in advance of the storm. However, the owners were subsequently found not guilty.

Washington Parish
Washington Parish, Louisiana is located north of New Orleans. The parish received significant damage due to wind damage and local flooding. The Parish is home to many pine forests in which many of the pine trees snapped or were completely uprooted. The eye of Katrina could be seen from the eastern part of the parish, in Bogalusa as Bogalusa was only fifteen miles away from the center of the eye. Much of Bogalusa was without power for weeks. Many major roads were covered by trees and were not cleared for many days. Schools did not reopen until October. As gasoline was in short supply even for emergency workers, the parish banned gas sales to the public for several days, arousing the ire of many locals.

Mississippi

Hurricane Katrina's devastating impact on the state of Mississippi caused a complete re-evaluation of hurricane command centers, safety, and offshore gambling. Because landfall was during daylight, many people survived by swimming to higher buildings and trees within sight. Afterward, all Mississippi counties were declared disaster areas (see map).

The Gulf Coast of Mississippi suffered massive damage from the impact of Hurricane Katrina on August 29, 2005, leaving 238 people dead, 67 missing, and an estimated $125 billion in damages. Since Katrina made its third and final landfall on the Louisiana/Mississippi state line, the storm's powerful northeastern quadrant hammered areas of Mississippi, as well as Alabama, causing extensive wind and flood damage. According to MSNBC, a  storm surge came ashore wiping out 90% of the buildings along the Biloxi-Gulfport coastline. The bridge between Bay St. Louis and Pass Christian was also damaged by the storm.

The three counties most affected by the storm were the coastal counties, Hancock County, Harrison County, and Jackson County.

Mississippi Emergency Management Agency (MEMA) officials also recorded deaths in Hinds, Warren, and Leake counties. About 800,000 people throughout the state experienced power outages, which is almost a third of the population.

United States Navy officials announced that two Arleigh Burke-class guided missile destroyers that were under construction at Litton-Ingalls Shipbuilding in Pascagoula had been damaged by the storm, as well as the amphibious assault ship .

Hancock County
Hancock County was the scene of the final landfall of the eye of Hurricane Katrina, and its communities and infrastructure suffered some of the most intense damage inflicted by that storm. Devastation occurred in many communities, including Waveland, Bay St. Louis, Pearlington, and Clermont Harbor.

Katrina practically obliterated Waveland, and state officials said that it took a harder hit from the wind and water than any other town along the coast. The storm dragged away almost every structure within one half mile of the beach, leaving driveways and walkways that went to nowhere. The death toll was estimated at 50.

In Bay St. Louis, Katrina destroyed many buildings, including the first floor and dormitories of Saint Stanislaus College and the Bay St. Louis Public Library.

Harrison County

Harrison County was hit particularly hard by the hurricane, as well as the storm surge. Its two coastal cities, Biloxi and Gulfport suffered severe damage and many casualties were reported. By September 1, 126 people were already confirmed dead.

Widespread damage was reported in the city of Biloxi and several of the city's attractions were destroyed. Many restaurants have been destroyed and several casino barges were pulled out of the water and onto land. Residents that recalled Hurricane Camille observed that Katrina was, "much worse", with a storm surge reportedly reaching further inland. Katrina's wind estimates were lighter than Camille's, and the central air pressure was slightly higher, but Camille was also a much smaller storm, so the greater impact of Katrina's surge may be due to the size.

The Biloxi-Ocean Springs Bridge was totally destroyed, and US 90 had heavy debris and severe damage to the roadbed.  Keesler Air Force Base in Biloxi was also damaged extensively.

In Pass Christian, the destruction was almost complete.

Jackson County
Jackson County, Mississippi had a coastal storm tide of at least , with Hurricane Katrina coming ashore during the morning high tide. Reports stated that 90% of Pascagoula was flooded by the storm surge, and the storm was so intense that 3 US Navy ships were damaged.  Moss Point and Escatawpa were also affected.

Although the severe hurricane-force winds were recorded mainly east of downtown New Orleans, extending into Alabama, heavy rainfall led to inland flooding, including counties in western Mississippi. Also, the eastern outer bands of Hurricane Katrina spawned 62 tornadoes to the northeast (none in Louisiana), with 11 tornadoes in Mississippi, and 2 tornadoes in Georgia.

For those reasons, all counties in Mississippi were affected in some tangible way, and hence, all Mississippi counties were designated as disaster areas for Federal assistance, with 49 lower counties eligible for full individual and public assistance.

Alabama

Hurricane Katrina was the fifth recent storm to hit Alabama, and Alabama suffered widespread, moderate-to-heavy damage caused by hurricane-force winds, flooding by a storm tide of 14–18 feet, and tornadoes.
Massive damage occurred along coastal areas, pushing small ships and oil rigs ashore, flooding fishing areas with dozens of shrimp boats, destroying marinas plus hundreds of boardwalks, and swamping beachfront homes or hotels, with widespread tree damage and roofs or shingles torn off. Afterward, 22 counties in Alabama were declared disaster areas for Federal assistance (see map above, "Federal Disaster Areas"), spanning a 400-mile (640-km) region.

A flotel (floating habitat used by oil platform crews) broke loose of its moorings and slammed into the Cochrane–Africatown USA Bridge; the bridge damage was later found not to be critical but in the meantime its traffic was reduced from four lanes to two. There was cause for concern because the bridge, in conjunction with underwater tunnels, is a part of the I-10 Hazardous Materials route across the Mobile River. The Battleship Parkway crossing Mobile Bay was also closed before the storm and was completely submerged during the hurricane. Many coastal homes south of the Point Clear area were severely damaged, flooded, or swept away.

Damage was quite heavy in coastal Alabama (comparable to Hurricane Ivan in 2004), including significant structural damage to many buildings. Bayou La Batre, a fishing town, sustained significant damage to its infrastructure and fishing fleet. It was the focal point of public attention given to Alabama in the aftermath of the storm. On Sunday, September 4, 2005, U.S. Secretary of State Condoleezza Rice visited a community center in Bayou La Batre and surveyed storm damage with Alabama Governor Bob Riley.
Some damage was reported in inland Alabama, as well, particularly related to fallen trees. An oil platform became grounded near Dauphin Island.

More than 584,000 people were left without power in Alabama immediately after the storm. Tornadoes were also reported near Brewton.

Towns on the Eastern Shore began regaining electric power on August 30, and power was restored to sections of Mobile beginning on the fifth day after the storm, September 3, 2005.

An (inland) tropical storm wind warning was issued in every county in Alabama along and west of I-65.

Georgia

Western Georgia was hit with the outer bands of Hurricane Katrina, resulting in heavy rains, damaging winds and several reports of tornadoes in Polk, Heard, and Carroll counties. In Polk County, three homes were damaged by a tornado. A fatal tornado in Carroll County resulted in the death of one person in a vehicle collision and caused damage to as many as 30 homes, and one additional fatality was reported.

Severe weather was also reported in northeastern Georgia, including tornadoes in White and Hall counties. In White County, a tornado struck the tourist town of Helen, ripping the top floor from an Econolodge hotel and damaging businesses at a nearby outlet mall. Thirty people were displaced by the storm, but no injuries were reported. In Hall County, several homes were reported damaged by a possible tornado in Lula. A tornado in a feeder band moved through Decatur County to the west of Bainbridge in southwestern Georgia during the evening of August 29.

On August 31, the price of gasoline shot up dramatically in and around the Atlanta metropolitan area, reaching as high as $6 per gallon. This was mainly due to consumer panic about lack of gasoline caused by Hurricane Katrina, which disrupted oil production in the Gulf of Mexico.

Other U.S. states and Canadian provinces

Arkansas
Arkansas avoided damage from Katrina, as the storm passed mainly to the east. The state established KARE (Katrina Assistance Relief Effort), a toll free telephone number and website for evacuees seeking assistance, and provided deep discounts on spaces at its state parks, waived pet restrictions, and allowed evacuees to stay even if other travelers had confirmed reservations (bumped travelers were offered either space at another state park or a gift certificate for future use). The governor instructed state agencies to take care of human needs first and worry about paperwork later.

Kentucky
Western Kentucky was already suffering flooding from storms that had passed through the area during the weekend prior to Katrina's arrival. Part of Christian County High School, located just outside Hopkinsville, collapsed during the weekend. Significant flooding was reported in the Hopkinsville area, and many homes were flooded. One person was killed in flood waters during Katrina that had already been high from the previous storm.

Governor Ernie Fletcher, declared Christian, Todd, and Trigg counties disaster areas due to flooding, and declared a statewide state of emergency.

New England
Over  of rain fell across parts of New England, especially in the northern part of the region. Gusty winds also caused many trees to fall across the region.

New York
High winds from the storm left about 4,500 people in Buffalo without power.

North Carolina
North Carolina avoided damage from the storm, but gas prices rose in response to interrupted supply lines. Local hospitals received some regional evacuees.

Ohio
In Ohio, some flooding and power outages were reported (including about 2,500 outages in the easternmost part of the state alone), and several areas were evacuated throughout the state. One hospital in Dennison had to be evacuated as it lost power and its generator failed, but it was restored later in the day. Two deaths were blamed on the storm in Ohio, both indirect deaths from an automobile accident caused by Katrina's rains in Huron County north of the village of Monroeville.

A F-0 force tornado hit Warren County on August 30, causing minor damage in Morrow and Salem Township. Three houses were damaged, but no injuries were reported.

Ontario
On August 30 heavy rain and tropical storm force wind gusts were reported in Southern Ontario as Katrina passed over the area before dissipating into a remnant low pressure system. There were also some spotty reports of flooding and damage due to fallen trees.

Pennsylvania
In Pennsylvania, at least two tornadoes spawned from Katrina's outer bands and touched down in the south-central part of the state south of Harrisburg. Numerous trees were blown down and several roofs were damaged.

Quebec
On August 31, the storm system previously known as Katrina was partially absorbed by a front and continued to produce heavy rainfall along the St. Lawrence River Valley. Several villages in the northeastern part of Quebec were isolated due to multiple washouts. Sections of roads were destroyed, effectively cutting these villages off via land travel. Affected areas were supplied by boats normally supplying the Magdalen Islands. The system crossed over uninhabited areas of Labrador before completely dissipating.

Tennessee
At the storm's peak, at least 80,000 customers were without power, primarily in the Memphis and Nashville areas.

Some damage was reported, primarily due to fallen trees. However, there were no deaths or injuries reported in Tennessee as a result of Katrina.

Tennessee was used as a staging area for Gulf Coast evacuees, particularly in and around Memphis.

Texas

Texas avoided any direct damage from Hurricane Katrina, but the state took in an estimated 220,000 people who sought refuge from Louisiana.

On August 31, the Harris County, Texas Department of Homeland Security and Emergency Management and the State of Louisiana came to an agreement to allow at least 25,000 evacuees from New Orleans, especially those who were sheltered in the Louisiana Superdome, to move to the Astrodome until they could return home. The evacuation began on September 1. President George W. Bush announced on September 4 that additional evacuees would be airlifted to other states.

The Reliant Astrodome in Houston took on some of the 25,000 who had initially sought shelter in the Louisiana Superdome in New Orleans, but quickly reached capacity and by September 2, was unable to accept additional hurricane evacuees from the disaster. The Astrodome was reopened a few hours later, after it was announced that all events scheduled through December 2005 would be cancelled so as to open the building to an additional 11,000 evacuees. City officials then opened two additional buildings adjacent to the Dome, the Arena, and the center, as well as the George R. Brown Convention Center in downtown Houston to house additional evacuees.

When the Houston shelters began to reach capacity on September 2, Governor Rick Perry activated an emergency plan that made space for an additional 25,000 each in San Antonio and the Dallas-Fort Worth Metroplex, as well as smaller shelters in communities across Texas. Beginning with a convoy of 50 buses (2,700 people) that arrived at Reunion Arena in Dallas at 3:00 AM CST on September 3, a wave of over 120,000 additional evacuees began pouring into Texas at a rate such that, as of September 5, it was estimated there were roughly 139,000 evacuees in official shelters around the state. This, added to the estimated 90,000 that were already in hotels and homes, overwhelmed local resources. Dallas quickly sought help from nearby cities to help accommodate more evacuees. A staging area at the unused Big Town Mall in Mesquite was opened, but was also quickly overloaded. Fort Worth and Arlington accepted some evacuees, and towns from as far away as Bonham and even Tulsa, Oklahoma offered to help.

By the afternoon of September 5, with a total estimated number of over 230,000 evacuees in Texas, Governor Perry ordered that buses begin being diverted to other shelters outside the state resulting in 20,000 being sent to Oklahoma and 30,000 being sent to Arkansas. By September 6, Texas had an estimated 250,000 evacuees and Governor Perry was forced to declare a state of emergency in Texas and issued an impassioned plea to other states to begin taking the 40,000-50,000 evacuees that were still in need of shelter.

Many communities in Texas opened up many of their services to evacuees from Louisiana, offering speedier enrollment for children in local school districts, speedy access to the Texas food stamp program, as well as access to health services for those being treated for diseases like tuberculosis and HIV. Texas state parks were opened free of charge to evacuees.

More than 300 students from Tulane University, including the school's football team, were displaced to Southern Methodist University in Dallas.

The New Orleans Saints NFL football team, who were displaced from their home facility at the Superdome, moved temporarily to San Antonio. The Saints' 2005 home games were split between the Alamodome in San Antonio and Louisiana State University's Tiger Stadium in Baton Rouge. On December 30, 2005, the team and the league announced that the club would play a split schedule again in 2006.

Virginia
In Virginia, a tornado related to Katrina's outer bands touched down in Marshall, damaging at least 13 homes. In addition, electricity was lost by about 4,000 customers. No deaths or injuries were reported.

West Virginia
Significant flooding was reported in several communities in West Virginia, including Sissonville, forcing some evacuations.

See also
 Effect of Hurricane Katrina on Mississippi
 Effect of Hurricane Katrina on New Orleans
 Hurricane Rita - caused evacuation panic near Houston; re-flooded HAWII.

References

External links
NOAA Aerial Survey Photos of the Affected Areas

Regions